A sounding rocket or rocketsonde, sometimes called a research rocket or a suborbital rocket, is an instrument-carrying rocket designed to take measurements and perform scientific experiments during its sub-orbital flight. The rockets are used to launch instruments from 48 to 145 km (30 to 90 miles) above the surface of the Earth, the altitude generally between weather balloons and satellites; the maximum altitude for balloons is about 40 km (25 miles) and the minimum for satellites is approximately 121 km (75 miles). Certain sounding rockets have an apogee between 1,000 and 1,500 km (620 and 930 miles), such as the Black Brant X and XII, which is the maximum apogee of their class. Sounding rockets often use military surplus rocket motors. NASA routinely flies the Terrier Mk 70 boosted Improved Orion, lifting 270–450-kg (600–1,000-pound) payloads into the exoatmospheric region between 97 and 201 km (60 and 125 miles).

Etymology
The origin of the term comes from nautical vocabulary to sound, which is to throw a weighted line from a ship into the water to measure the water's depth. The term itself has its etymological roots in the Romance languages word for probe, of which there are nouns sonda and sonde and verbs like sondear which means "to do a survey or a poll". Sounding in the rocket context is equivalent to "taking a measurement".

Design 

The basic elements of a sounding rocket are a solid-fuel rocket motor and a science payload. Larger, higher altitude rockets have two to three stages to increase efficiency and payload capability.  The freefall part of the flight is an elliptic trajectory with vertical major axis allowing the payload to appear to hover near its apogee. The average flight time is less than 30 minutes; usually between five and 20 minutes. The rocket consumes its fuel on the first stage of the rising part of the flight, then separates and falls away, leaving the payload to complete the arc and return to the ground under a parachute.

Advantages 
Sounding rockets are advantageous for some research because of their low cost, short lead time (sometimes less than six months) and their ability to conduct research in areas inaccessible to either balloons or satellites. They are also used as test beds for equipment that will be used in more expensive and risky orbital spaceflight missions. The smaller size of a sounding rocket also makes launching from temporary sites possible, allowing field studies at remote locations, and even in the middle of the ocean, if fired from a ship.

Applications

Meteorology

Weather observations, up to an altitude of 75 km, are done with rocketsondes, a kind of sounding rocket for atmospheric observations that consists of a rocket and radiosonde. The sonde records data on temperature, moisture, wind speed and direction, wind shear, atmospheric pressure, and air density during the flight.  Position data (altitude and latitude/longitude) may also be recorded.

Common meteorological rockets are the Loki and Super Loki, typically a 3.7 m tall and powered by a 10 cm diameter solid fuel rocket engine.  The rocket engine separates at an altitude of 1500 m and the rest of the rocketsonde coasts to apogee (highest point). This can be set to an altitude of 20 km to 113 km.

Research
Sounding rockets are commonly used for:
 Research in aeronomy, the study of the upper atmosphere, which requires this tool for in situ measurements in the upper atmosphere
Ultraviolet and X-ray astronomy, which require being above the bulk of the Earth's atmosphere
Microgravity research which benefits from a few minutes of weightlessness on rockets launched to altitudes of a few hundred kilometers
Remote Sensing of Earth Resources uses sounding rockets to get an essentially instant synoptic view of the geographical area under observation.

Dual use
Due to the high military relevance of ballistic missile technology, there has always been a close relationship between sounding rockets and military missiles. It is a typical dual-use technology, which can be used for both civil and military purposes. During the Cold War, the Federal Republic of Germany cooperated on this topic with countries that had not signed the Non-Proliferation Treaty on Nuclear Weapons at that time, such as Brazil, Argentina and India. In the course of investigations by the German peace movement, this cooperation was revealed by a group of physicists in 1983. The international discussion that was thus set in motion led to the development of the Missile Technology Control Regime (MTCR) at the level of G7 states. Since then, lists of technological equipment whose export is subject to strict controls have been drawn up within the MTCR framework.

Operators and programs
 Andøya Space Center in Norway operates two sounding rocket launch sites, one at Andøya and one at Svalbard. Has launched sounding rockets since 1962.
 Poker Flat Research Range is owned by the University of Alaska Fairbanks.
 The British Skylark sounding rocket programme began in 1955 and was used for 441 launches from 1957 to 2005. Skylark 12, from 1976, could lift  to  altitude.
 ISRO's VSSC developed the Rohini sounding rockets series starting in 1967 that reached altitudes of 500 km
 Delft Aerospace Rocket Engineering from the Delft University of Technology operates the Stratos sounding rocket program, which reached 21.5 km in 2015. 
 The Australian Space Research Institute (ASRI) operates a Small Sounding Rocket Program (SSRP) for launching payloads (mostly educational) to altitudes of about 7 km
 Indian Institute of Space Science and Technology (IIST) launched a Sounding Rocket (Vyom) in May, 2012, which reached an altitude of 15 km. Vyom Mk-II is in its conceptual design stage with an objective to reach 70 km altitude with 20 kg payload capacity.
 The University of Queensland operates Terrier-Orion sounding rockets (capable of reaching altitudes in excess of 300 km) as part of their HyShot hypersonics research
 Iranian Space Agency operated its first sounding rocket in February 2007
 UP Aerospace operates the SpaceLoft XL sounding rocket that can reach altitudes of 225 km
 TEXUS and MiniTEXUS, German rocket programmes at Esrange for DLR and ESA microgravity research programmes
 Astrium operates missions with sounding rockets on a commercial basis, as prime contractor to ESA or the German Aerospace Centre (DLR). 
 MASER, Swedish rocket programme at Esrange for ESA microgravity research programmes
 MAXUS, German-Swedish rocket programme at Esrange for ESA microgravity research programmes 
 Pakistan's SUPARCO launched Rehbar series of sounding rockets from 1962 to 1971. A total of 200 rockets were launched.
 REXUS, German-Swedish rocket programme at Esrange for DLR and ESA student experiment programmes 
 The NASA Sounding Rocket Program
 The JAXA operates the sounding rockets S-Series: S-310 / S-520 / SS-520.
 United States/New Zealand company Rocket Lab developed the highly adaptable Ātea series of sounding rockets to carry 5–70 kg payloads to altitudes of 250 km or greater
 The Meteor rockets were built in Poland between 1963 and 1974.
 The Kartika I rocket was built and launched in Indonesia by LAPAN on 1964, becoming the third sounding rocket in Asia, after those from Japan and Pakistan.
 The Soviet Union developed an extensive program using rockets such as the M-100, the most used ever; its successor by its successor state, Russia, is the MR-20 and later the MR-30.
 Brazil has been launching its own sounding rockets since 1965. The largest and most current family of rocket are the Sonda, which are the R&D basis for Brazil's soon-to-be-launched VLS satellite launcher. Other rockets include the VSB-30
 The Paulet I rocket was built and launched in Peru by The National Commission for Aerospace Research and Development (CONIDA) on 2006, becoming the first sounding rocket of the country and the third rocket in South America, after those from Brazil and Argentina.
The Experimental Sounding Rocket Association (ESRA) is a non-profit organization based on the United States, operates the Intercollegiate Rocket Engineering Competition (IREC) since 2006.
 ONERA in France launched a sounding rocket by the name of Titus. It was developed for observation of the total solar eclipse in Argentina on November 12, 1966. The Titus was a two-stage rocket with a length of 11.5 m, a launch weight of 3.4 tons, and a diameter of 56 cm. It reached a maximum height of 270 kilometers. The Titus was launched twice in Las Palmas, Chaco during the eclipse in collaboration with the Argentinian space agency CNIE.
 German Aerospace Center's Mobile Rocket Base (DLR MORABA) designs, builds and operates a variety of sounding rocket types and custom vehicles in support for national and international research programs.
 Interstellar Technologies is a Japanese company that is developing the experimental MOMO sounding rocket.

See also

References

External links

 Sounding rockets at EADS Astrium page
 ESA article on sounding rockets
 30 years of sounding rocket launches at Esrange in Kiruna, Sweden
 NASA Sounding Rocket Program
 NASA Sounding Rocket Operations Contract
 NASA Sounding Rockets, 1958–1968: A Historical Summary (NASA SP-4401, 1971)
 Australian Space Research Institute Small Sounding Rocket Program
 German, Swedish and EADS-ST Programmes
 MASER Programme of the Swedish Space Corporation
Sounding rockets launched from Andøya Space Center in Norway
Experimental Sounding Rocket Association (ESRA)

 
Meteorological instrumentation and equipment